Trivellato is a surname. Notable people with the surname include: 

Alex Trivellato (born 1993), Italian ice hockey player
Francesca Trivellato (born 1970), Italian historian

Italian-language surnames